Lutherstadt Eisleben was a Verwaltungsgemeinschaft ("collective municipality") in the Mansfeld-Südharz district, in Saxony-Anhalt, Germany. The seat of the Verwaltungsgemeinschaft was in Eisleben. It was disbanded on 1 January 2010.

The Verwaltungsgemeinschaft Lutherstadt Eisleben consisted of the following municipalities:

 Burgsdorf
 Eisleben
 Hedersleben

References

Eisleben
Former Verwaltungsgemeinschaften in Saxony-Anhalt